Bhādõ is the sixth month of the Nanakshahi calendar and Punjabi calendar. This month coincides with Bhadra in the Hindu calendar and the Indian national calendar, and August and September in the Gregorian and Julian calendars, and is 31 days long.

Important events during this month

August
August 16 (1 Bhadon) – The start of the month
August 30 (15 Bhadon) – The completion of the Sri Guru Granth Sahib (Adi Granth)

September
September 1 (17 Bhadon) – First Prakash of the Sri Guru Granth Sahib Ji
September 12 (28 Bhadon) – Battle of Saragarhi

External links
www.srigranth.org SGGS Page 133
www.sikhcoalition.org

Months of the Nanakshahi calendar
Sikh terminology